Hans Stiebner (19 November 1898 – 27 March 1958) was a German actor.

Steibner was born in Vetschau, Germany as Hans Friedrich Wilhelm Georg Paul Stiebner. He died in 1958 in Baden-Baden, West Germany.

Selected filmography

 The Grand Duke's Finances (1934)
 Holiday From Myself (1934)
 Men Without a Fatherland (1937)
 Land of Love (1937)
 The Ruler (1937)
 White Slaves (1937)
 Sergeant Berry (1938)
 The Impossible Mister Pitt (1938)
 We Danced Around the World (1939)
 Police Report (1939)
 Robert and Bertram (1939)
 A Regular Fellow (1939)
 Men Are That Way (1939)
 Alarm at Station III (1939)
 Nanette (1940)
 Counterfeiters (1940)
 The Unfaithful Eckehart (1940)
 Twilight (1940)
 The Rothschilds (1940)
 Mein Leben für Irland (1941)
 Uncle Kruger (1941)
 The Red Terror (1942)
 The Thing About Styx (1942)
 Romance in a Minor Key (1943)
 The Bath in the Barn (1943)
 The Woman of My Dreams (1944)
 Somewhere in Berlin (1946)
 Thank You, I'm Fine (1948)
 Journey to Happiness (1948)
 The Appeal to Conscience (1949)
 Don't Dream, Annette (1949)
 The Great Mandarin (1949)
 The Woman from Last Night (1950)
 Dark Eyes (1951)
 Torreani (1951)
 When the Heath Dreams at Night (1952)
 Towers of Silence (1952)
 Pension Schöller (1952)
 The Day Before the Wedding (1952)
 Klettermaxe (1952)
 Weekend in Paradise (1952)
 Fight of the Tertia (1952)
 Diary of a Married Woman (1953)
 Ave Maria (1953)
 Red Roses, Red Lips, Red Wine (1953)
 Captain Wronski (1954)
 My Sister and I (1954)
 Before God and Man (1955)
 Die Ratten (1955)
 The Spanish Fly (1955)
 Doctor Crippen Lives (1958)
 Two Hearts in May (1958)

Bibliography
 Fox, Jo. Film propaganda in Britain and Nazi Germany: World War II Cinema. Berg, 2007.

External links

1898 births
1958 deaths
People from Vetschau
People from the Province of Brandenburg
German male film actors
20th-century German male actors